No Dope on Sundays is the debut studio album by American rapper Cyhi the Prynce released on November 17, 2017, by Sony Music. The album's release follows years of label disputes and series of mixtapes spanning his career. It features guest appearances from GOOD Music labelmates Kanye West and Pusha T, alongside Schoolboy Q, Travis Scott, 2 Chainz, Jagged Edge, BJ the Chicago Kid, Estelle, and Ernestine Johnson. Meanwhile, production is handled by Mark Byrd, Edsclusive, S1, OZ, Syk Sense, among others.

Background
The album's cover art, tracklist and release date was revealed on November 10, 2017.

Singles
The lead single, "Movin' Around" featuring Schoolboy Q was released on June 29, 2017.

The second single, "Dat Side" featuring Kanye West, was released on October 27, 2017.

Critical reception

No Dope on Sundays received positive reviews from music critics upon release. Scott Glaysher of XXL praised the album's cohesiveness and lyricism, stating: "No matter which way you slice it, CyHi The Prynce excels in his delivery on his official debut, making No Dope on Sundays a serious contender for one of the best albums of the year. He proves that jaw-dropping lyrical ability and vivid storytelling can be woven through catchy production to make the ultimate rap apex. With his goals of completely taking over the game in 2018, the album’s cohesive feel and stellar lyrical quality gets him closer to his final destination." Justin Ivey of HipHopDX stated that CyHi The Prynce "expands his artistry to show he’s more than a lyrical dynamo. It’s not always crisp, particularly when he strains his vocals on occasion, but it shows a willingness to challenge himself in the studio beyond penning meticulous bars", adding that No Dope On Sundays "is the culmination of a long journey that’s defied the odds."

Online publication HotNewHipHop concluded that CyHi The Prynce "finds a way to display his faith, paint stories of his hood, and rally for Black power without ever sounding preachy or overzealous; if Malcolm X had a rapping descendant, Cy would be him. Equally menacing and welcoming, raspy and smooth, CyHi the Prynce proves to the world that he will not be another rapper doomed to watch his debut sit on a dusty shelf, waiting in limbo for a release. He broke through his own struggles and crafted an album that deserves your attention. No Dope on Sundays may be one of the best rap albums of the year."

Jay Balfour of Pitchfork praised the album's lyricism and production, stating: "For all the bases it covers, No Dope on Sundays benefits from swift pacing. But there are still moments where CyHi gets bogged down doing too much and too little at the same time, coddling a story you’ve heard before or quipping a one-liner you can predict a mile away. After his verse on the title track, Pusha T thanks CyHi for granting him the quiet of an inconspicuous feature. “I was tryna’ make it as conversational as possible, ‘cause it’s just conversation,” the elder emcee says after clocking a gracefully minimal performance. CyHi doesn't have that conversational approachability to his raps. He sounds like a showman that puffs out his words with a deliberate, almost suspicious confidence. No Dope on Sundays sounds like the routine he's been waiting years to finally deliver.

Track listing
Credits adapted from iTunes, Tidal and ASCAP.

Notes
  signifies a co-producer
  signifies an uncredited co-producer
 "No Dope on Sundays" feature background vocals from Artia Lockett, Kevin Bateman, Keisha Jackson, Kourtney Williams, Paris Williams and Cortez Harris
 "Get Yo Money" feature background vocals from V. Johnson, Ox and Novel
 "Don't Know Why" feature background vocals from LaKiery Shaffer
 "Looking For Love" feature background vocals from Kellye West, Artia Lockett, Kevin Bateman, Shonette McCalmon and Keisha Jackson
 "I'm Fine" feature background vocals from Pastor Cortez Harris
Sample Credits
"No Dope On Sundays" contains elements from "Incense and Peppermints" as performed by Strawberry Alarm Clock, written by John S. Carter and Timothy P. Gilbert.
"Get Yo Money" contains elements from "Your Love Was Worth Waiting For" performed by The Ruffin Brothers.
"Trick Me" contains elements from "Algo Más Que Un Amigo" performed by Raphael.
"Murda" contains elements from "World a Music" performed by Ini Kamoze.
"Don't Know Why" contains elements from "Living inside Your Love" performed by Earl Klugh.
"Dat Side" contains elements from "In Love Again" performed by Georgi Stanchev.
"Looking For Love" contains elements from "Whatcha Lookin' 4" performed by Kirk Franklin.
"Closer" contains elements from "Let's Get Closer", as performed by Atlantic Starr and "22 Two's" as performed by Jay-Z.
"Free" contains elements from "Free", as written and performed by Flyt.

Personnel
Credits adapted from Tidal.

Performers
 Cyhi the Prynce – primary artist
 Pusha T – featured artist 
 Schoolboy Q – featured artist 
 2 Chainz – featured artist 
 Estelle – featured artist 
 Jagged Edge – featured artist 
 Kanye West – featured artist 
 Ernestine Johnson – featured artist 
 BJ the Chicago Kid – featured artist 
 Travis Scott – featured artist 

Musicians
 Anthony Majors, Jr. – drums 
 Lance Powlis – fluegelhorn 
 Jonathan Troy – bass 
 Trey Daniels – saxophone , alto saxophone 
 Eric Mobley – guitar 

Technical
 Cydel Young – recording engineer 
 Brandon Black – recording engineer 
 Finis "KY" White – mixing engineer 
 Dave Kutch – mastering engineer 
 Anthony Kilhoffer – mixing engineer 
 John Horesco – mastering engineer 
 Anthony Majors, Jr. – recording engineer 
 Darius Jenkins – recording engineer 
 Glenn Schick – mastering engineer 
 Daniel Watson – recording engineer 
 Noah Goldstein – recording engineer 
 Brad Post – recording engineer 

Production
 Kanye West – Executive Producer 
 The Olympicks – producer 
 Edsclusive – co-producer , producer 
 Mark Byrd – producer 
 Lex Luger – producer 
 Novel – producer 
 Shawty Redd – producer 
 HighDefRazjah – uncredited co-producer 
 Young Love – uncredited co-producer 
 Brandon Black – producer 
 Syk Sense – producer 
 OZ – producer 
 David & Eli – producer 
 Anthony Kilhoffer – producer 
 Nate & Charity – producer 
 ThankGod4Cody – producer 
 Free P – producer 
 Epikh Pro – producer 
 S1 – producer 
 Fr23sh – producer 
 Jaggerwerks – uncredited co-producer 
 Katherine Mills – producer 
 Josh Simons – producer 
 Charlie Heat – uncredited co-producer 

Additional personnel
 Isaac Carter – consultant

Charts

References

2017 debut albums
Sony Music albums
Cyhi the Prynce albums
Albums produced by Kanye West